Dumb and Dumber is a Hanna-Barbera-produced animated series based on the 1994 comedy film of the same name. The animated series premiered in 1995 on ABC.

Matt Frewer provided the voice of Lloyd Christmas (Jim Carrey's character in the film), while Bill Fagerbakke voiced the character of Harry Dunn (Jeff Daniels' character in the movie). The animated series was written by Bennett Yellin, co-writer of the original film. The series was cancelled after one season.

Dumb and Dumber was one of three animated series based on Jim Carrey films premiering in the same year; the others are the 1995–2000 Ace Ventura: Pet Detective series, and the 1995–1997 The Mask: Animated Series.

Premise 
The cartoon revolves around the continued misadventures of Lloyd and Harry after reacquiring their dogshaped van now named "Otto". It also features a new character, Kitty, a female pet purple beaver who appears to be smarter than both men.

Voice cast 
 Bill Fagerbakke as Harry Dunne
 Matt Frewer as Lloyd Christmas
 Tom Kenny as Weenie

Episodes

Production 
Dumb and Dumber: The Animated Series is the final Hanna-Barbera-produced show to premiere on ABC (as well as the final Hanna-Barbera-produced show to air on broadcast network television) and one of the last Saturday morning cartoons on the network not associated with The Walt Disney Company. The series was produced by Hanna-Barbera in association with New Line Cinema (the distributor of the original film).

Release

Broadcast 
The series aired in reruns on Cartoon Network after its cancellation.

In Britain, the series was screened on Cartoon Network before receiving terrestrial airings on Children 4 (unlike The Mask: Animated Series and Ace Ventura: Pet Detective, two other shows based on a film starring Jim Carrey, both of which were shown by the BBC).

Home media 
Warner Archive released Dumb and Dumber: The Complete Series on DVD in region 1 as part of their Warner Archive Collection in January 2015. This is a Manufacture-on-Demand (MOD) release, available exclusively through Warner's online store and Amazon.com.

A tape containing some episodes of the show, including "Dumb Luck", was released in Australia and Russia in the 1990s, but in the United States, the show was not released on home video until 2015.

A pop album called "Get Down Get Dumb" was released to promote the cartoon due to its popularity.

Streaming 
All 13 episodes of the series are available for purchase on Amazon Video, YouTube, and Google Play.

References

External links 

 

Animated television shows based on films
Dumb and Dumber (franchise)
1995 American television series debuts
1996 American television series endings
1990s American animated television series
American Broadcasting Company original programming
Television shows set in Rhode Island
Television series by Hanna-Barbera
Television series by New Line Television
American children's animated comedy television series
American animated television spin-offs
Animated duos